Walter Steffens may refer to:

 Walter Steffens (gymnast) (1908–2006), Olympic gymnastic champion
 Walter Steffens (composer) (born 1934), German composer